Creepy Crawlers is an animated television series from 1994, produced by Saban Entertainment, that aired in syndication in the United States. 
Ownership of the series passed to Disney in 2001 when Disney acquired Fox Kids Worldwide, which also includes Saban Entertainment. The series is not available on Disney+.

Premise
The show is about Chris Carter, a self-described "normal kid" who is interested in magic. While working at the Magic Shop of bitter discredited stage illusionist Professor Googengrime, Chris designed and built a device he called "The Magic Maker", ostensibly for use in some unspecified magic trick. A particular once-every-thousand-years planetary alignment, the Magical Millennium Moment, rained down cosmic energies on the shop one fateful night, which somehow made the Magic Maker capable of creating strange, man-sized bug/magic trick composite mutant creatures. The three creatures formed that night, Hocus Locust, Volt Jolt and T-3 (dubbed "Goop-Mandos" by Googengrime), despite looking bizarre, turned out to be friendly, and joined forces with Chris, but Googengrime kept the Magic Maker when Chris and the Goop-Mandos escaped from the shop. Each episode thereafter concerned Googengrime's latest attempt to gain power and conquer the world with a Magic Maker-created "Crime Grime" monster, and Chris and The Goop-Mandos' efforts to stop him, and retrieve the Magic Maker from his evil clutches.

As the series went on, more Goop-Mandos were created. In addition, a young girl named "Sammy" Reynolds became a close ally of the group.

Some sitcom style humor was derived by the concept that the Goop-Mandos were required to recharge after missions by hanging upside-down in the large closet in Chris' room. This concept was derived from a small oozing hourglass-like device housed in the lower torso of each Goop-Mando Action Figure. Although the Carter parents never made an appearance on the show (their voices were heard off-screen in a few episodes), Chris' older brother Todd, a vain and surly "valley dude", was constantly suspicious of the extracurricular goings-on around the house. And blonde kid named Max who is the bearer of the Cap who becomes a friend of Chris Furthermore, when the Goop-Mandos needed transportation to a battle site, they would often confiscate Todd's custom dune buggy, using doses of "Goop" to transform it temporarily into the Goozooka "Crawler Cruiser" assault Vehicle. The villains used a similar vehicle called the Bug-Eyed Bomber.

At the Opening of Season Two, Professor Googengrime created a formula, Super Goop, to try destroy the Goop-Mandos, but it backfired, furthering their mutations. The Goop-Mandos changed colors, gained new abilities and became much stronger.

Characters

Goop-Mandos
 Chris Carter (voiced by Joey Camen) – Creator of the Magic Maker. The mysterious Magical Millennium Moment has thrown Chris into a world of magic, monsters and awesome battles, as he and his Goop-Mandos must fight Professor Googengrime and his creatures and try and take back the Magic Maker before Professor Googengrime takes over the world.
 Samantha "Sammy" Reynolds (voiced by Heidi Lenhart) – A pretty and headstrong girl, Sammy is one of Chris' closest friends (and possibly his girlfriend). Fit and courageous, she would occasionally save the day, but complain that villains (and occasionally the heroes) would overlook her solely because she is a girl. During an episode when Chris was infected by Goop and began transforming into a human-bug hybrid, he and Sammy went to the school dance together. Chris' older brother Todd is apparently interested in her, which also aided the Goop-Mandos' plots on occasion.
 Volt Jolt (voiced by Jan Rabson) – Created from a floating light bulb and based on a lightning bug, Volt Jolt is one of the three original Goop-Mandos, he always wore a pair of lightning shaped shades. He has electrical powers and can fire electricity to zap the Crime Grimes.
 T-3 (voiced by Jonny K. Lamb) – Short for Tick Trick Tick, T-3 was created from a pack of cards and based on a tick, T-3 is one of the original Goop-Mandos who is the largest of the group and is their strong man. He is able to fire card-like darts shaped like the different suits with amazing speed and accuracy. He also has a "little buddy" named T-Flea based on a flea that he kept with him. T-3 must also have had some trace of a "shell game" in his genetic code, for his shoulder pads resembled huge walnut shells, and T-Flea could usually be found hiding beneath them.
 Hocus Locust (voiced by Tony Pope) – Created from rope tricks and based on a locust, Hocus Locust is one of the original Goop-Mandos and is the jokester of the group, always having fun, and often lapsing into inane celebrity impersonations. He has rope coiled around his body which he can control to attack or use for many other purposes, he also is the only Goop-Mando to have four arms. After the Goop-Mandos get their upgrade his rope becomes nylon cords with sharp ends.
 Sting Ring (voiced by Art Kimbro) – Created from inter-connecting rings and based on a wasp, Sting Ring was accidentally created when some rings fell into the Magic Maker. At first they mistook him for a Crime Grime but quickly realised he was one of them. He has the power to throw his rings with great power to knock out or cut up enemies. He also could give the group wings which allowed them to fly. After the Goop-Mandos' upgrade his rings are able to do many new things like exploding and many other things.
 Commantis (voiced by Cam Clarke) – Created from kung fu/karate and samurai movie tapes and based on a mantis, Commantis was created when Spooky Goopy accidentally dropped his videotapes into the Magic Maker. Professor Googengrime tried to get him to join him, but after realizing he was evil, Commantis joined up with the Goop-Mandos. Commantis is noble like a samurai and carries two samurai swords on his back which he can use to slice up opponents and is able to throw his voice. After the Goop-Mandos' upgrade he is able to blend into his surroundings.
 T-4 – In the second season Googengrime accidentally created T-3's "little brother", T-4, in an attempt to reprogram T-3. The ploy backfired when T-3 fired a few card-darts into a hose connected to the Magic Maker, which turned into T-4. T-4 has four heads and is stronger than T-3, but not as smart.
 Fire Eyes – Created from chillies, peppers, hot sauce and various other hot stuff and based on a firefly. Fire Eyes was created to help combat an ice monster created by Professor Googengrime to freeze the city. He is able to shoot heat beams from his eyes, instantly melting stuff.

Crime Grimes
 Professor Googengrime (voiced by Tony Pope) – A failed illusionist who after discovering the Magic Maker decides to try take over the world, he begins to create monsters to help but is constantly stopped by the Goop-Mandos. His first creation and constant companion is Spooky Goopy. His motto is "Make, bake, overtake!" The Professor's last name has been spelled two different ways, depending on the source: "Googengrime" according to elements referencing the TV Show, and "Guggengrime", an alternate spelling used by ToyMax in their product literature.
 Spooky Goopy (voiced by Cam Clarke) – Professor Googengrime's right-hand monster, a green skeletal monster with handcuffs for hands. He is able to use his cuffs to capture monsters for Professor Googengrime and often serves as comic relief. He wears a talking Top Hat (voiced by Jan Rabson) with which he is usually arguing.
 Shockaroach – A nasty, cockroach-based monster, Googengrime unleashed swarms of these ravenous pests on the city time and again, only to be thwarted time and again by The Creepy Crawlers Goop-Mandos.
 Squirminator (voiced by Steve Bulen) – Based on a worm, a monstrous creation of Professor Googengrime that is powerful and deadly. His tail has a mace on the end of it and is able to knock the Goop-Mandos out cold, he is also able to utilize his army of squirmy worms which he carries with him at all times. Being grotesque and ugly, he is a challenge for the Goop-Mandos. A second one is created which has a drill on the end of its tail so he can get goop from the Earth's core; he is programmed to tunnel every time he hears the word dig.
 Rumble Bee – A grotesque, crazed bee the size of a small car.
 2-Ugly (voiced by Jonny K. Lamb) – 2-Ugly is able to separate its head from its body, causing double trouble wherever it writhes. The original 2-Ugly went awry and tried to destroy Googengrime, but later the Professor created its brother 2-Ugly-2.
 2-Ugly 2 (voiced by Jonny K. Lamb) – 2-Ugly's brother who was more controllable.
 Bat out of Smell – A gigantic bat monster. It can incapacitate most anything with a noxious blast of its horrible "bat-breath".
 Spider Patrol – A brown-haired humanoid spider monster.
 FrankenFly – Powered by the same "Super Goop" that gave the heroic Goop-Mandos their new powers at the beginning of Season Two, the gargantuan rampaging FrankenFly combined components of a flat-headed, bolt-necked Frankenstein stereotype and an ordinary housefly. Oddly, FrankenFly did not fly.
 Skrull – A skull-headed machine monster built from metal components and animated with magic Goop, Googengrime's Skrull was not based on an insect, and did not come from the Magic Maker, like most other Crime Grimes. Was created as a replacement for Spooky but was destroyed by the Goop Mandoes.
 Sergeant Spidey – Googengrime's enforcer in a Summer Camp scam was Sergeant Spidey, a bright red militaristic arachnid Drill Sergeant that could spit capturing webs from his mouth.
 Bugzilla – Googengrime animated a Movie Museum wax figure of Bugzilla, a giant rampaging black mantis that can shoot lasers from its eyes, and loosed it on the city leaders for snubbing him for a magician's award.
 Ice Scream – A frosty monster that can freeze an entire city by screaming.

Other Interested Parties
 Tom Lockjaw (voiced by Tony Pope) – The lead newscaster for Channel 27 News, the bombastic Tom Lockjaw (a play on the name of Tom Brokaw) was always on hand to report on the latest monster rampage perpetrated by Googengrime and His Crime Grimes.
 Colonel Ka-Boom – This decorated colonel with "Pentagon Special Services" was committed to capturing/wiping out the twin menaces of the Crime Grimes and The Goop-Mandos, which he saw as un-patriotic threats to American Freedom. Although his single-minded devotion to his mission often seemed to border on insanity, with a literal army of tanks, jeeps and anti-missile aircraft at his disposal, few people stuck around long enough to question his methods.
 Todd Carter (voiced by Cam Clarke) – Chris's older brother.

Cast
 Tony Pope –  Professor Googengrime, Hocus Locust, Tom Lockjaw
 Cam Clarke – Commantis, Spooky Goopy, Todd Carter
 Steve Bulen – Squirminator
 Johnny K. Lamb – T-3, 2-Ugly
 Melodee Lee – Samantha "Sammy" Reynolds
 Jan Rabson – Top Hat, Volt Jolt
 Reed Waxman – Chris Carter
 Tyrone Week – Sting Ring
 O.R. Yarbles –

Crew
 Jamie Simone – Voice Director
 Joel Andryc - Producer/Story Editor
 Peter Kingston - Animation Director

Origin and development
The Creepy Crawlers TV Show was based on ToyMax's Creepy Crawlers Activity toy. A line of 12 action figures were made by ToyMax in conjunction with the show, as well as the Goozooka Assault vehicle. A "Creepy Crawlers Action Figure Playset" was depicted in the 1994 ToyMax toy booklet, but was apparently not produced. Each figure came with a metal mold for use with the Creepy Crawlers toy oven, to make custom accessories for the figure using Plasti-Goop.

The Creepy Crawlers TV show debuted in first-run syndication in the Fall of 1994. The show was produced by Saban Entertainment, known for their Mighty Morphin Power Rangers and other live-action adventure programs. Creepy Crawlers was sponsored heavily by several ToyMax products, including Incredible Edibles and DollyMaker, and other Saban programs such as VR Troopers. The show aired sporadically on weekends through the spring of 1996, airing a total of 23 episodes during its two-year run.

Episodes

Season One (1994–95)

Season Two (1995–96)

See also

 Creepy Crawlers

Notes

References

External links
 

1990s American animated television series
1990s American comic science fiction television series
1994 American television series debuts
1996 American television series endings
1990s French animated television series
1994 French television series debuts
1996 French television series endings
American children's animated adventure television series
American children's animated comic science fiction television series
American children's animated horror television series
French children's animated adventure television series
French children's animated comic science fiction television series
French children's animated horror television series
Television series by Saban Entertainment
1990s toys
Television shows based on Mattel toys
Jetix original programming
English-language television shows